The Lijiaxia Dam is a concrete arch-gravity dam on the Yellow River in Jainca County, Qinghai Province, China. The dam houses a hydroelectric power station with 5 x 400 MW generators for a total installed capacity of 2,000 MW. Construction began in April 1988 and the reservoir began to fill on December 26, 1996. On January 26, 1997, the initial reservoir operating level was reached and the first generator was commissioned in February.

See also 

 List of power stations in China

References

Hydroelectric power stations in Qinghai
Dams in China
Dams on the Yellow River
Dams completed in 1997